Isobel Bizu Beardshaw (born 28 April 1994), better known as Izzy Bizu, is an English-Ethiopian singer-songwriter signed to Epic Records. Bizu has garnered mainstream radio support from BBC Radio 1's Annie Mac and Phil Taggart and BBC Radio 1Xtra's Trevor Nelson. She has supported Coldplay, Sam Smith, Rudimental, and Foxes on their latest UK tours. In November 2015, Bizu was shortlisted for a Brit Critics' Choice award and longlisted for BBC's Sound of... 2016. She won the BBC Music Introducing Award at the 2016 ceremony. On 25 June 2016, Bizu performed on the Park Stage at the Glastonbury Festival.

Biography
Izzy Bizu is from southwest London, and attended Stamford High School, Lincolnshire. Her mother is Ethiopian and her father is English. She grew up between Ethiopia and Bahrain, where her father worked, before moving to London as a teen. She studied music tech in college, but dropped out shortly afterwards.

Career

2013: Coolbeanz
After the girl group SoundGirl split, Bizu won an open mic night competition in February 2013 winning over the crowd, which included Emeli Sande and Naughty Boy, who were in attendance. She released her first independent EP, Coolbeanz, in September 2013, which debuted at number 3 on the iTunes Soul and RnB Chart and has sold 50,000 copies. The EP’s lead single, "White Tiger", was also chosen as Zane Lowe’s ‘Next Hype’. In October 2013, she supported Sam Smith on his UK tour, and in November Jamie Cullum handpicked her to open for him at The Roundhouse in London.

2014–16: A Moment of Madness
In January 2014, Bizu entered Glastonbury Festival's Emerging Talent Competition and made it to the final 8 of the competition, performing at the live finals of the event at Pilton Working Men's Club in April 2014. Bizu was named runner-up, winning £2,500 from the PRS Foundation and a slot at that year's Glastonbury Festival.

In June 2014, Bizu was also selected by BBC Introducing to perform at the Glastonbury Festival. In July 2014, she signed to Epic Records UK. A year later, she released the first singles from her debut album, "Adam & Eve" and "Diamond", which enjoyed support from BBC Radio 1, Radio 2 and 1Xtra, and performed at Glastonbury for the second time.

In September 2015, following the release of her single "Give Me Love", she also made her TV debut on Later... with Jools Holland. Bizu supported both Rudimental and Foxes on their UK headline tours.  In November 2015, Bizu was shortlisted for a Brit Critics' Choice award. In January 2016 Bizu's song 'White Tiger' featured on the advert for National Citizen Service (NCS) and in March 2016 she performed at NCS Yes Live alongside Tinie Tempah and Jess Glynne. Her debut album, A Moment of Madness, was released on 2 September 2016. In April 2016, Bizu recorded (with the BBC Concert Orchestra) an uptempo, updated version of the Edith Piaf 1957 hit "La Foule" as the theme music for the BBC's coverage of the Euro 2016 Football Tournament.

Izzy Bizu was featured as a vocalist on Milky Chance's track "Bad Things" on their 2017 album Blossom.

Artistry
Bizu has described herself as a fan of jazz-fusion mixes and a lover of squat parties and warehouse raves. She grew up listening to Whitney Houston, Ella Fitzgerald, Bettye Swann and James Brown and draws on these influences alongside newer influences such as Amy Winehouse and Adele to create a fusion of soul, funk, jazz and pop. She lists The Black Keys, Diana Ross, Grammatics and Sam Cooke among her other influences.

Discography

Albums

Extended plays

Singles

As lead artist

As featured artist

Notes

References

External links

 

English people of Ethiopian descent
Epic Records artists
English soul musicians
English women singer-songwriters
English soul singers
Living people
Singers from London
British contemporary R&B singers
21st-century Black British women singers
1994 births
People educated at Stamford High School, Lincolnshire